Andrzej Rej may refer to:
Andrzej Rej (starost) (died 1664), Polish governor
Andrzej Rej (diplomat) (1584–1641), Polish diplomat